Hannah Wallett (born 20 November 1990) is an Australian rules footballer who played for the Greater Western Sydney Giants in the AFL Women's competition. Wallett was recruited by Greater Western Sydney as a free agent in October 2016. She played four matches in her debut season. She was delisted at the end of the 2017 season.

References

External links 

1990 births
Living people
Greater Western Sydney Giants (AFLW) players
Australian rules footballers from the Australian Capital Territory